WFIZ (95.5 FM) is a radio station broadcasting a Top 40 (CHR) format. Licensed to Odessa, New York, United States, the station serves the Ithaca, New York area.  The station is currently owned by the Cayuga Radio Group subsidiary of Saga Communications, Inc. as of February 2014.

History
The station signed on in 1968 as "WFLR-FM" and had been broadcasting a country music format on 95.9 FM in Dundee, New York as "Country 95.9". On September 15, 2008, the station was moved to the current 95.5 FM frequency in Odessa, New York (Ithaca market) with a Top 40 format as "Z95-5".

In February 2014, Saga Communications completed their purchase of WFIZ-FM, along with its HD2 frequency. In August of that year, the broadcast studio was moved from its original location on Danby Road in Ithaca to join the other studios already owned by the company.

References

External links
Z95.5 official website

FIZ
Contemporary hit radio stations in the United States
Radio stations established in 1980